Michele Di Ruberto (born 28 August 1934) is an Italian prelate of the Roman Catholic Church. He currently Secretary Emeritus of the Congregation for the Causes of Saints.

Di Ruberto was born in Pietra Montecorvino, and was ordained to the priesthood on 29 September 1957. He graduated from the Pontifical Lateran University and the University of Naples, and then entered the Roman Curia in the Congregation for the Causes of Saints in 1969. In 1984, Di Ruberto was placed in charge of verifying miracles attributed to candidates for canonization, and in 1993 was named the Congregation's Undersecretary.

On 5 May 2007, he was appointed Secretary of Causes of Saints and Titular Archbishop of Biccari by Pope Benedict XVI. He received his episcopal consecration on the following 30 June from Cardinal Secretary of State Tarcisio Bertone, SDB, with Cardinal José Saraiva Martins and Bishop Francesco Zerrillo serving as co-consecrators.

He is an expert in canon and civil law.

External links 

Interview with 30 Days
Whispers in the Loggia: "On 'Swiss Day,' a Changing of the (Curial) Guard"
Catholic-Hierarchy

1934 births
Living people
21st-century Italian Roman Catholic titular archbishops
Pontifical Lateran University alumni
Members of the Congregation for the Causes of Saints